Henry Chase may refer to:
 Henry Seymour Chase Jr. (1853–1889), 19th Century American Marine Artist
 Henry B. Chase (1870–1961), mayor of Huntsville, Alabama
 Henry A. Chase (1841–?), member of the Wisconsin State Assembly
 Henry Chase (1860s politician) (died 1871), member of the Wisconsin State Assembly

See also  
 Harry Chase (disambiguation)